Leucanopsis mandus is a moth of the family Erebidae found in Brazil. It was described by Gottlieb August Wilhelm Herrich-Schäffer in 1855.

References

 

mandus
Moths described in 1855